Brad Bufanda (born Fred Joseph Bufanda III; May 4, 1983 – November 1, 2017) was an American actor. He was known for his recurring role as Felix Toombs in the television series Veronica Mars, as well as his self-made Internet videos.

Career
Bufanda began his professional acting career in 1994 starring in the independent action film Pocket Ninjas. He appeared on television the first time in 1994 as the Hero Boy in a Skechers commercial. At the age of 12 he starred in the ABC weekend special The Secret of Lizard Woman. While in middle school he appeared on the ABC series Roseanne and Hangin' with Mr. Cooper.

Bufanda later appeared in a number of television shows including CBS's CSI: Miami, Fox's Malcolm in the Middle, Disney Channel's Even Stevens, and NBC's soap opera Days of Our Lives. Bufanda portrayed Felix Toombs in the first two seasons of the series Veronica Mars. He starred in the Cinemax series Co-Ed Confidential (credited as Bradley Joseph) from 2008 to 2010, in addition to filming and editing the show's reunion.

Staying credited as Bradley Joseph, Bufanda appeared in the psychological thriller Dark Tourist in 2012. 2017 marked Bufanda's brief return to film with a supporting role in the action comedy Garlic & Gunpowder.

Death
On November 1, 2017, Bufanda died by suicide at the age of 34 by jumping off of his residential tower in the Park La Brea apartment community of Los Angeles. According to the Los Angeles County Coroner's office, a suicide note was found at the scene. The note, which was found on or near his body, cited the names of his parents and thanked important people in his life.

Filmography

Film

Television

References

External links
  
      
 

1983 births
2017 suicides
20th-century American male actors
21st-century American male actors
American male child actors
American male film actors
American male television actors
Male actors from Greater Los Angeles
People from Upland, California
Suicides by jumping in California